Bradley Darren Hamilton (born 30 August 1992) is an English professional footballer who last played as a defender for Heybridge Swifts.

Career

Colchester United
Hamilton, born in Newham, London, is a versatile player who can either play across the defence or in the heart of midfield. He was one of four young players to be awarded a professional contract by Colchester United at the end of the 2010–11 season. Shortly after signing his contract Hamilton had a loan spell at local non-league side Redbridge alongside Craig Arnott, where he made nine appearances.

On 22 March 2012 Hamilton went out on loan, this time to another local side, Conference South side Chelmsford for one month, where he failed to make an appearance other than as an unused substitute, before returning to Colchester.

Hamilton made his senior debut for Colchester coming on for Andy Bond with 5 minutes to go in a 4–2 win against Tranmere Rovers on 28 April 2012.

On 30 November 2012, Hamilton was sent out on loan once again to Chelmsford alongside teammate Thomas Bender until 7 January 2013. He came on as a 76th-minute substitute in an FA Cup second round tie against Crawley Town on 1 December 2012, a game which the Clarets lost 3–0. His loan with Chelmsford was extended until the end of the 2012–13 season in January 2013.

Concord Rangers

After falling out of favour under Colchester manager Joe Dunne, Hamilton was released at the end of his contract with the club. He joined newly promoted Conference South side Concord Rangers in June 2013.

Career statistics

A.  The "League" column constitutes appearances and goals (including those as a substitute) in the Football League and Conference South. 
B.  The "Other" column constitutes appearances and goals (including those as a substitute) in the FA Trophy.

References

External links

1992 births
Living people
People from the London Borough of Newham
Association football defenders
English footballers
Colchester United F.C. players
Redbridge F.C. players
Chelmsford City F.C. players
Concord Rangers F.C. players
Heybridge Swifts F.C. players
English Football League players
National League (English football) players